The following is a list of tulip species and cultivars which have gained the Royal Horticultural Society's Award of Garden Merit. They are bulbous perennials, originally from sunny, open habitats in Europe and Asia. Thousands of cultivars are available in a huge range of sizes, shapes and colours (other than pure blue). They are usually sold as bulbs to be planted in autumn and winter for flowering in mid- to late spring. They are frequently treated as bedding plants, accompanied by other seasonal favourites such as wallflowers and forget-me-nots, flowering for one season before being discarded. However, in favoured locations they can be left in the ground to re-appear the following and subsequent years. Like many other bulbous plants they require a hot, dry dormant period in the summer.

Groups
Tulips are divided into 15 distinct groups:-
Lily-flowered - long, narrow blooms with flared, pointed petals; late spring
Fringed - edges of petals are fringed with a different colour; late spring
Viridiflora - flowers striped with green, or entirely green; late spring
Rembrandt - "broken" colours (striped or feathered) caused by a virus; late spring
Parrot - unevenly striped with irregularly cut edges; late spring
Double late - peony-shaped fully double flowers; late spring
Kaufmanniana - T. kaufmanniana and its hybrids, multi-coloured; early to mid-spring
Fosteriana - T. fosteriana and its hybrids; mid-spring
Greigii - T. greigii and its hybrids; early to mid-spring
Miscellaneous - all species and hybrids not included elsewhere; the smaller species require sharp drainage and are best grown in an alpine garden

Listing

References

Tulips